Juinagar is an area in Navi Mumbai of Maharashtra state in Konkan division. It is also the name of a railway station on the Harbour Line of the Mumbai Suburban Railway. Railway colony is the biggest colony in Juinagar though much of the residential blocks belong to the CIDCO and a few other private housing societies. The main market is near Sadguru Hotel and Suyog Arcade - which is the most prominent complex in the area. On the whole, Juinagar is a small but self-sufficient township having excellent connectivity to Vashi and Nerul. Of late, the sprawling of a multi-facility hospital named Mangal Prabhu and a new petrol pump at the main market has made life more convenient for the dwellers.

Transport 

BEST and NMMT buses serve as a means of public transport. Buses starting from or passing through Juinagar allow passengers direct passage to destinations across Mumbai, Thane, Kalyan-Dombivali, Panvel and Uran. Auto rickshaws are also available very easily to go to any other area. Juinagar is connected by rail on the harbour line, part of the Mumbai suburban railway. Travelling to destinations across Mumbai by rail often involves taking a train to the Chhatrapati Shivaji Terminus (CST).

Landmarks
There is a market selling vegetables, fruit, fish and other daily necessities.

Chincholi Talao is famous during Ganeshotsav and other festivals as a place for the immersion of idols. There is a popular walking track around the pond.
Juinagarcha Raja Jai bhavani mitra mandal Sec-23, Juinagar is the oldest and largest association in the Juinagar they have started their journey in the year 2002, and now they are celebrating their thirteen years.

References 

Navi Mumbai
2. Shri Ranganath kharbhari auti NAGARSEVAK